Miss America 1966, the 39th Miss America pageant, was held at the Boardwalk Hall in Atlantic City, New Jersey on September 11, 1965 on CBS Network.

Deborah Bryant became the first Miss Kansas to win the crown. The judges for this year's pageant included actress Joan Crawford.

Results

Order of announcements

Top 10

Top 5

Awards

Preliminary awards

Other awards

Contestants

References

External links
 Miss America official website

1966
1965 in the United States
1966 beauty pageants
1965 in New Jersey
September 1965 events in the United States
Events in Atlantic City, New Jersey